Colin Archibald (born 26 May 1942) is a South African cricketer. He played in six first-class matches for Eastern Province in 1963/64.

See also
 List of Eastern Province representative cricketers

References

External links
 

1942 births
Living people
South African cricketers
Eastern Province cricketers
Cricketers from Durban